JAMfest Super Nationals is one of the biggest competitions that JAMfest Cheer and Dance offers.  This competition has been held in Indianapolis, Indiana since 1999 inside the Indiana Convention Center, where this event has been and will be held until 2020.  This event is planned around the second or third weekend in January and is a two-day competition.  The first day of competing is worth 25% of your total score and the second and final day is worth the other 75% of your score. For the last 5 years there have been over 400 cheerleading teams that have attended and competed and those teams have come from over twenty states and two countries.  This event is one of the biggest steps for All Star Cheerleaders and can hopefully land them a bid to The Cheerleading Worlds. The Cheerleading Worlds is the "final destination" in an All Star Cheerleaders life.  It is where they show everything they have in two minute and thirty seconds in hopes of becoming World Champions. The day before JAMfest Super Nationals actually starts, another competition is held for certain elite teams from all over. This smaller competition is only a one day event, and your team must be invited to compete. This one day event is known as the Majors and the teams that compete in it, are classified as "the best of the best".

The Cheerleading Worlds
The Cheerleading Worlds is the highest success for any all star level 5 team. The Cheerleading Worlds competition is held in Orlando, Florida every year. School teams and "All-Star" teams once competed against each other when this competition was first founded. The National Cheerleaders Association decided that these teams needed to be separated. So they created different divisions for each level of team and their difficulty. Teams attend competitions like JAMfest Super Nationals to obtain a bid to this competition.  Cheerleaders are only able to compete at worlds if their team receives a bid or an "invite." The Cheerleading Worlds is held every year in Orlando, Florida at ESPNs Wide World of Sports. On top of trophies, banners, and medals that can be won, they also win a World Champion ring.

Jammy
Jammy is not only the mascot for JAMfest Cheer and Dance  but he is also their spirit icon.  Jammy attends every JAMfest event and is constantly on the look out for the next spirit award winner.  Having good spirit is a great and positive way to get any team noticed and Jammy makes sure those teams get the recognition they deserve.

Awards

References

Festivals in Indiana
1999 establishments in Indiana
Cheerleading competitions